Person To Person: Live At The Blue Note is a Ben E. King live album.  It was recorded live at the Blue Note Jazz Club in New York City.  The album was released on Half Note Records in 2003.

Track listing

"Short Stomp" [6:06]
"Harlem Nocturne" [4:39]
"Let the Good Times Roll" [4:47]
"Young Boy Blues" [5:18]
"Person to Person" [5:37]
"Little Mama" [4:04]
"Under the Boardwalk" [4:55]
"Spanish Harlem" [3:50]
"Stand by Me" [3:54]
"Hallelujah I Love Her So" [5:49]
"There'll Be Some Changes Made" [5:34]

Credits
John Abbott - Cover Portrait
Steven Bensusan - Executive Producer
Andy Bigan - Assistant
Carlton Cabey - Photography
Steve Count - Band, Bass, Bass (Acoustic)
Rina Davidovich - Cover Art
Alan Ferber - Band, Trombone
Lou Gimenez - Mixing Assistant, Sound Editing
Guido Gonzalez - Band, Flugelhorn, Trumpet
Lee Greene - Band, Flute, Sax (Tenor)
Ben E. King - Composer, Executive Producer, Mixing, Primary Artist, Vocals
Jack Kreisberg - Mixing, Producer
Rick Kriska - Band, Flute, Sax (Baritone)
Jeff Levenson - Executive in Charge of Music
Wade Marcus - Arranger
Rich Mercurio - Band, Drums
Jack O'Hara - Announcer
Al Orlo - Band, Guitar
Tim Ouimette - Arranger, Band, Composer, Conductor, Flugelhorn, Mixing, Trumpet
Judy Palma - Band, Piano
Bob Porter - Liner Notes
Steven Remote - Coordinater, Recording Engineer, Mixing Engineer
Tom Walsh - Mastering
Dan Wilensky - Band, Flute, Sax (Alto)

References

Ben E. King albums
2003 live albums
Albums arranged by Wade Marcus
Albums recorded at the Blue Note Jazz Club